Waves4Power is a Swedish-based developer of buoy-based Offshore Wave Energy Converter (OWEC) systems. A demonstration plant was installed in 2016 at the Runde Environmental Centre in Norway where testing was conducted with WaveEL, an offshore buoy. This was connected via sub-sea cable to the shore based power grid.  

In 2020, the company received a grant from Ocean DEMO enabling it to access the power-connected test berths at EMEC for three years. In addition Waves4Power will be able to sell and deliver electricity to the power grid in Scotland according to the rules set out in a power Purchase agreement.  During the three year period, Waves4Power will receive up to GBP 300,000 every year for three years. 

A partnership with Dutch engineering specialist BnD-Engineering is moving to commercialize and deploy the system on a global scale.

Ongoing research and development is done with Chalmers University of Technology.

References 

Renewable energy